Charles Otto Schmutz (January 1, 1891 in San Diego, California – June 27, 1962 in Seattle, Washington) nicknamed "King", was a pitcher in Major League Baseball. He pitched for the 1914–1915 Brooklyn Robins.

While pitching for the Northwestern League Vancouver Beavers, he was known as a "spitball artist, and one of the best in the league".

References

External links

1891 births
1962 deaths
Baseball players from San Diego
Major League Baseball pitchers
Brooklyn Robins players
Tacoma Tigers players
Vancouver Beavers players
Salt Lake City Bees players
Newark Indians players
Harrisburg Senators players
Seattle Giants players